HDEP-28 or ethylnaphthidate is a piperidine based stimulant drug, closely related to ethylphenidate, but with the benzene ring replaced by naphthalene. It is even more closely related to HDMP-28, which acts as a potent serotonin–norepinephrine–dopamine reuptake inhibitor with several times the potency of methylphenidate and a short duration of action.

Legality
HDEP-28 was banned in the UK as a Temporary Class Drug from June 2015 following its unapproved sale as a designer drug, alongside 4-Methylmethylphenidate.

See also 
 2β-Propanoyl-3β-(2-naphthyl)-tropane (WF-23)
 3,4-Dichloromethylphenidate
 4-Methylmethylphenidate
 4-Fluoromethylphenidate
 Isopropylphenidate
 Naphthylisopropylamine
 Naphyrone
 Propylphenidate

References 

Serotonin–norepinephrine–dopamine reuptake inhibitors
Stimulants
Designer drugs
2-Naphthyl compounds
2-Piperidinyl compounds